Franco Jelovčić (born 6 July 1991) is a Croatian futsal player who plays for Napoli A5 Calcio and the Croatia national futsal team.

References

External links 
 UEFA profile
 

1991 births
Living people
Futsal forwards
Sportspeople from Šibenik
Croatian men's futsal players